Aurora, Colorado, held an election for mayor on November 1, 2011. It saw the election of Steve Hogan.

Results

References 

Aurora
Mayoral elections in Aurora, Colorado
Aurora, Colorado